The Szeged Idea, also informally known as Szeged fascism refers to the proto-fascist ideology that developed among anti-communist counter-revolutionaries in Szeged, Hungary in 1919 and which later developed into an ideology resembling Nazism. The Szeged Idea was based upon the claim that Hungary was stabbed in the back in World War I by communists and Jews and promoted action to undo this evil by declaring holy war against such traitors. Szeged militants promoted Hungarian nationalism, an economic "third way", and advocated a "strong" state. Szegedists promoted irredentist claims to territories belonging to Hungary prior to the end of World War I. The ideology claimed the existence of a "Judeo-Bolshevik" conspiracy in Hungary. The principal leader of the Szegedists was Gyula Gömbös. Gömbös declared violence to be an acceptable means of statecraft...to shape the course of history, not in the interest of a narrow clique, but of an entire nation. Upon being appointed Prime Minister, Gömbös adopted fascist positions, including the promotion of corporatist solutions to national unity like that of Benito Mussolini and racial policy like that of Adolf Hitler. Gömbös declared that his government would secure our national civilization based upon our own special racial peculiarities and upon Christian moral principles.

References

See also
 Hungarian National Defence Association
 Party of Hungarian Life

Szeged
Anti-communism in Hungary
Antisemitism in Hungary
Fascism in Hungary
Politics of Hungary
Proto-fascists
Third Position